The Combined Universities in Cornwall (CUC) is a project to provide higher education in Cornwall, England, which is one of the poorest areas of the United Kingdom in terms of GVA per capita.

History 
Developed in the early 2000s, following the work of the Camborne and University of Cornwall Support Group (a pressure group that is composed mostly of Cornish graduates), professionals founded the CUC in 1997 to seek a collaboration of all HE providers in Cornwall in working towards the establishment of a free-standing Cornish university in the future and to oppose the loss of the Camborne School of Mines from the depressed towns, Camborne and Redruth. 

With funds from the European Union Objective One and the South West Regional Development Agency, the CUC serves to fight the "brain drain" of students to the rest of the United Kingdom. Historically, most Cornish students have had to leave the county to obtain higher education, and they then never returned to contribute their knowledge and skills to the Cornish economy. 
The establishment of CUC is itself a contribution to the expansion of the Cornish economy, and all proposed developments within the CUC umbrella are required to show how they will contribute to Cornish prosperity.

Like a number of other recent projects in UK higher education, CUC involves collaboration between several institutions, but it is probably unique in the number and range of institutions involved. 
It is conceived on a "hub and spokes" model, with different institutions offering different kinds of provision in different locations. The CUC central administration is based at Trevenson House in Pool, Cornwall, and the "rim" sites have been placed at a number of different locations. There are in fact two "hubs". One is the Tremough campus, originally developed for the Falmouth College of Arts (now Falmouth University). Here, degrees are offered by Falmouth University and by the University of Exeter, Cornwall Campus; the University of Exeter has international-standard research teams located here. Halls of residence are provided, and the campus attracts students on a national and international basis, though it is also intended to be attractive to local students. The second hub is the "health spa" at the Royal Cornwall Hospital, Treliske site, which provides facilities for the Peninsula Medical School (a joint operation of the University of Exeter, the University of Plymouth, and the National Health Service in Devon and Cornwall), and for the Institute of Health Studies of the University of Plymouth, which teaches nursing and other subjects allied to medicine.

The "rim" consists of two tertiary institutions: Cornwall College and Truro and Penwith College, which, in addition to their further education work, offer a range of higher education courses from sub-degree to master's degree level under franchise from the University of Plymouth. These colleges are part of the University of Plymouth Colleges network (UPC), and their courses are particularly (though not exclusively) aimed at encouraging wider participation in higher education by students from the South West of Britain.

Partnership and institutions 
CUC exists as an unincorporated association between the following universities and colleges:
 University of Exeter, including the Camborne School of Mines and the Institute of Cornish Studies
 University of Plymouth
 Falmouth University
 Cornwall College
 Truro and Penwith College

References

External links 

 Combined Universities in Cornwall official site
  OFSTED Report (on the FE provision)

 
Education in Cornwall